Stratton Manor is a historic plantation house located near Cape Charles, Northampton County, Virginia. It was built in the third quarter of the 18th century, and is a -story, single-pile, gable roof house with a wood-frame core of three bays with brick ends. A two-story ell was added in the first quarter of the 20th century.  It is a characteristic example of the 18th-century vernacular architecture distinctive of Virginia's Eastern Shore.

The house has the name of Benjamin Stratton, the original owner of the site. Stratton Manor was listed on the National Register of Historic Places in 1980.

References

External links
Stratton Manor, State Route 642 vicinity, Cheriton, Northampton County, VA 2 photos at Historic American Buildings Survey

Historic American Buildings Survey in Virginia
Plantation houses in Virginia
Houses on the National Register of Historic Places in Virginia
Houses in Northampton County, Virginia
National Register of Historic Places in Northampton County, Virginia